Elections to the provincial, county (district) and city (municipal) people's assemblies (도(직할시)·시(구역)·군 인민회의 대의원 선거) in North Korea were held on 21 July 2019.

Preparations
On 10 June 2019, the Presidium of the Supreme People's Assembly released a report announcing an election for the local people's committees scheduled for 21 July 2019.

On 13 June, the SPA Presidium issued Decision No. 7 which organized a central election guidance committee for the local people's assembly elections that consisted of Thae Hyong-chol as chairman, Kim Phyong-hae as vice-chairman, Jong Yong-guk as secretary, and Choe Pu-il, Kim Yong-ho, Pak Chol-min, Jo Yong-gil, Kim Chang-yop, and Jang Chun-sil as members.

On 22 June, Rodong Sinmun reported that constituencies and sub-constituencies for the election have been organized.

On 24 June, Rodong Sinmun reported that constituency and sub-constituency election committees have been organized.

On 7 July, Rodong Sinmun reported that constituency and sub-constituency election committees have displayed lists of eligible voters for the election.

On 20 July, Rodong Sinmun reported that the nomination and registration of candidates has been completed on 17 July, and that profiles of candidates in the election have been displayed at all constituencies, and polling stations have been set up.

Election day 
Voting began at 9:00 AM local time, with the Central Election Guidance Committee(중앙선거지도위원회) reporting that the voter turnout reached 72.07% by 12:00 PM local time.

The Central Election Guidance Committee reported that the voter turnout reached 99.98% at the end of the voting.

Kim Jong-un was reported to have cast his vote for Ju Song-ho and Jong Song-sik at Sub-Constituency No. 94 of Constituency No. 201 of South Hamgyong Province.

Results 
The Central Election Guidance Committee said in a report on 22 July that 27,876 local people's assembly deputies were elected with all of them receiving 100% of the vote.

See also

Elections in North Korea

References

Local elections in North Korea
2019 in North Korea
North